Qian, also spelt Chin, Chien, Tsien, or Zee in Wu Chinese, is a common Chinese family name. The name literally means "money". Qian is listed at the second place in the Song Dynasty text Hundred Family Surnames, in the line 趙錢孫李 (Zhao, Qian, Sun, Li). As the royal surname of the kingdom of Wuyue, Qian was regarded as second only to Zhao, the imperial surname of the Song. As of 2008, Qian is the 96th most common surname in China, shared by 2.2 million people, with the province with the most people sharing the name being Jiangsu, an area formerly within the Wuyue kingdom.

Origins
According to the Song dynasty book, Tongzhi, the Qian surname is descended from Zhuanxu, one of the legendary Five Emperors, via Pengzu, the founder of the Peng kingdom in modern-day Jiangsu during the Shang dynasty. A Zhou dynasty official, Fu, was a descendant of Pengzu and served in the royal Treasury, the Qianfu ("Money Office"). His descendants adopted the surname "Qian", literally "money", from his title.

Being descendants of the Peng kingdom, the Qian family originally congregated around Xiapi, in modern-day Jiangsu. The surname spread from there, now has its highest concentration of it in the Jiangnan region. During the Five Dynasties and Ten Kingdoms period (907-960), Qian Liu and his descendants ruled the independent kingdom of Wuyue in south-eastern China. Qian Liu had many sons, who were posted to different parts of his kingdom, greatly increasing the density of the Qian surname within the former territory of Wuyue. This area comprises today's Zhejiang, Shanghai, southern Jiangsu and northern Fujian. After Wuyue submitted to the Song Dynasty in 978, the last king moved to Bianjing, the Song capital in modern-day Henan. The Qian family was thereafter prominent at the Song court, with Qian Chu's son, Qian Weiyan, serving as a prominent Chancellor. During this period, the Qian family also spread to northern China.

Notable people

Pre-modern
  (1686–1774), Qing dynasty minister
 Empress Qian (?–1468), wife of the Zhengtong Emperor of Ming
 Qian Qi (錢起) (710–782), Tang dynasty poet
 The royal family of Wuyue, especially:
 Qian Chu (錢俶) (929–988), last king
 Qian Liu (錢鏐) (852–932), founder
 Qian Qianyi (钱谦益) (1582–1664), Ming dynasty official and author
  (1791–1863), Qing dynasty bibliophile, official
 Qian Weiyan (钱惟演) (962–1034), Song Chancellor, Duke
  (1783–1850), Qing dynasty official, geographer
  (1824–1902), Qing dynasty official, Grand Councillor

Modern
 Ch'ien Mu (錢穆) (1895–1990), historian
 Qian Baojun (钱宝钧) (1907–1996), polymer chemist and educator, co-founder of Donghua University
 Chin Kar-lok (錢嘉樂) (born 1965), actor and action choreographer
 Fredrick Chien (錢復) (born 1935), Republic of China politician, diplomat
 Qian Changzhao (1899–1988), industrialist and politician
 Qian Liren (錢李仁) (born 1924), People's Republic of China politician, diplomat
 Qian Nairong (born 1945), linguist
 Qian Nancy (钱楠筠) (born 1978), economist, Northwestern University Professor
 Qian Qichen (钱其琛) (1928–2017), Foreign Minister of the People's Republic of China
 Qian Sanqiang (钱三强) (1913–1992), nuclear physicist
 Chien Shih-Liang (錢思亮) (1908–1983), chemist and educator
 Qian Weichang (錢偉長) (1913–2010), physicist and mathematician
  (born 1966), Tibetologist and Indologist, Fudan University professor
 Qian Xiuling (錢秀玲; 1912–2008), Chinese emigrant to Belgium who helped save hundreds of Belgians from execution by the Nazi
 Qian Xuantong (錢玄同) (1887–1939), linguist
 Qian Xuesen (Tsien Hsue-shen) (錢學森) (1911–2009), rocket scientist and physicist
  (1903–1973), People's Republic of China politician
 Qian Ying (錢英) Chinese politician
 Qian Qihu (钱七虎) (born 1937), military engineer
 Qian Yunlu (钱运录) (born 1944), People's Republic of China politician
 Qian Zhengying (钱正英) (1923–2022), hydrologist, People's Republic of China politician
  (1900–1994), Minister of Light Industry and Minister of Textile Industry
 Qian Zhijun (钱志君) (born 1987), actor and subject of the "Little Fatty" internet meme
  (born 1960), former President of China National Nuclear Corporation
 Qian Zhongshu (錢鍾書) (1910–1998), scholar and writer
 Qian Zhuangfei (1895–1935), Chinese intelligence agent
 Robert Tienwen Chien (錢天問) (1931-1983), American Computer Scientist, University of Illinois Professor, Director of Coordinated Science Laboratory
 Ronny Chieng (錢信伊), Malaysian Chinese standup comedian and actor
 Roger Y. Tsien (錢永健) (1952-2016), biologist, 2008 Nobel Prize winner
 Shu Chien (錢煦) (born 1931), biological scientist and engineer
 Tsien Tsuen-hsuin (錢存訓) (1909−2015), sinologist, University of Chicago professor
 Qian Min (钱敏) (1927–2019), mathematical physicist, winner of the 11th Hua Luogeng Prize in Mathematics
 Joe Z. Tsien (钱卓) (born 1962), Neuroscientist and geneticist, the pioneer of Cre/lox neurogenetics and the creator of smart mouse Doogie.  He is also known for his Theory of Connectivity regarding the basic logic of brain computation and the origin of intelligence.
  Chang-Kan Chien (1904-1940) Engineer, builder of Hangzhou bridge, bridges on the Burma Road during WWII.  Was killed by Japanese fighter planes during the war.
Qian Kun (钱锟) (born 1996) Singer, member of South Korean group NCT and its Chinese sub-unit WayV (威神V)

Meanings of Qian (钱/錢)
 A type of farm tool, especially an iron spade.
 Ancient Chinese coinage, especially copper coins.
 Cost, expense, fee, etc., derived from its meaning related to Chinese coinage.
 Meaning of property, derived from its meaning related to Chinese coinage.
 Small round objects similar to a coin, derived from its meaning related to Chinese coinage.
 Mace, a traditional mass unit of Chinese units of measurement, equaling to one tenth of one tael.
 A surname.

See also

 All Wikipedia pages beginning with Qian

References

Chinese-language surnames
Individual Chinese surnames